Pterophorus spissa is a moth of the family Pterophoridae. It is known from the Republic of Congo, the Democratic Republic of Congo, Ghana and Nigeria.

The forewings are pure white with small black spots at the inner margin of both lobes. The fringes show a distinct black and white pattern.

References

spissa
Insects of the Democratic Republic of the Congo
Insects of West Africa
Fauna of the Republic of the Congo
Moths of Africa
Moths described in 1969